Erik J. Larson is an American writer, tech entrepreneur, computer scientist. He is author of The Myth of Artificial Intelligence: Why Computers Can’t Think the Way We Do.

He has written for The Atlantic, The Hedgehog Review, the Los Angeles Review of Books, Wired, and professional journals. His other projects include two DARPA-funded startups, the most recent a company that provides influence rankings for colleges and universities using an influence ranking algorithm.

Education 
Larson graduated from Whitworth University in Spokane, Washington in 1994 as an All America Scholar Athlete. He earned a PhD in philosophy from The University of Texas at Austin in 2009, where his dissertation was a hybrid combining work in computer science, linguistics, and philosophy.

Career 
In the early 2000s, Larson worked for Cycorp, home of the Cyc artificial intelligence project, on a knowledge-based approach to network security. He then researched and published articles on knowledge base technology, ontology, and the Semantic Web for the Digital Media Collaboratory, a research lab founded by American businessman George Kozmetsky affiliated with the Innovation, Creativity, and Capital Institute, at The University of Texas at Austin. He founded his first company, Knexient, in 2009 with funding from DARPA to process open source text documents using his Hierarchical Document Classifier algorithm. Larson later co-founded Influence Networks after developing an algorithm to produce web-based rankings of colleges and universities with funding from DARPA. The algorithm is the foundation for the AcademicInflunce.com InfluenceRanking Engine. In 2020 Larson joined Knowledge Based Systems, Inc. in College Station, Texas as a Research Scientist specializing in natural language processing.

Larson has also written articles for  The Atlantic, Los Angeles Review of Books, Wired magazine, and The Hedgehog Review, as well as for The Metro Silicon Valley and Inference: International Review of Science.

The Myth of Artificial Intelligence 
Larson's book, The Myth of Artificial Intelligence: Why Computers Can’t Think the Way We Do was published by Harvard University Press on April 6, 2021. In the book, "Larson argues that AI hype is both bad science and bad for science. A culture of invention thrives on exploring unknowns, not overselling existing methods. Inductive AI will continue to improve at narrow tasks, but if we want to make real progress, we will need to start by more fully appreciating the only true intelligence we know—our own." While this title offers clarity for those bewildered by yet another AI spring, references to Turing do not address very much of Turing's work. A Turing machine manipulates symbols. Turing's AI is described as mechanistic because the "intelligence" in Turing's AI is not suggested as a replacement for human intelligence and the other forms of intelligence which naysayers like to throw in the mix.

In his endorsement of The Myth of Artificial Intelligence, venture capitalist Peter Thiel wrote "If you want to know about AI, read this book...it shows how a supposedly futuristic reverence for Artificial Intelligence retards progress when it denigrates our most irreplaceable resource for any future progress: our own human intelligence.” The book also received endorsements from writer John Horgan and CEO of the Allen Institute for Artificial Intelligence Oren Etzioni. It has been reviewed for The Critic, Engadget, Fast Company, The Financial Times, Inside Story, The New Atlantis, The New York Review of Books, Prometheus: Critical Studies in Innovation, R&A Enterprise Architecture, Tech Monitor, TechTalks, The Times Literary Supplement, Towards Data Science, The Wall Street Journal, and The Wire India. Larson has also made several media along with conference appearances in relation to the book, such as the Lawfare podcast and COSM 2021.

References 

21st-century American journalists
21st-century American businesspeople
American computer scientists
Whitworth University alumni
University of Texas at Austin alumni
1971 births
Living people